Hammington is a surname. Notable people with the surname include:
 Kayne Hammington (born 1990), New Zealand rugby player
 Sam Hammington (born 1977), New Zealand-born Australian comedian